is a multi-use stadium in Kumagaya, Saitama, Japan. The stadium is part of a larger sports complex which includes a smaller athletics stadium, a rugby stadium and a large Arena. The complex is located in the Kumagaya Park.

Uses
The Athletic Stadium itself includes a 9-lane athletic track and is one of the main tracks of the Japan Association of Athletics Federations, hosting athletics events through the year.  
The stadium is also the alternative stadium of the football team Omiya Ardija which plays some matches there. 
Some pre-season and Emperor's Cup matches are also played at the stadium.

The rugby stadium will host matches during the 2019 Rugby World Cup.

References

External links
Stadium webpage at J. League site
StadiumDB page

Football venues in Japan
Athletics (track and field) venues in Japan
Sports venues in Saitama Prefecture
Kumagaya
Sports venues completed in 2003
2003 establishments in Japan